

Q

References